Homegrown is the 40th studio album by Canadian-American Neil Young. It was released on June 19, 2020, by Reprise Records. The album consists of material recorded between June 1974 and January 1975. The album was recorded after the release of On the Beach and before the sessions for Zuma.  Like those two albums, much of the material was inspired by Young's relationship with actress Carrie Snodgress, which was deteriorating in 1974.  The album was compiled and prepared for release in 1975.  Instead, Tonight's the Night was released in its place, and Homegrown remained unreleased for decades.  It was finally set for release as part of Record Store Day 2020, amid Neil Young's ongoing Archives campaign. Its release was again delayed by Record Store Day's postponement due to the COVID-19 pandemic, before finally seeing release on June 19.

Sessions
In mid-June 1974, Young recorded several acoustic performances of new material at his home studio at the Broken Arrow Ranch. Later that month, he would convene Crosby, Stills, Nash & Young for further sessions and rehearsals for the upcoming stadium tour. Author Peter Doggett says the group recorded a few songs during the rehearsals for the tour. On June 15, Young recorded solo performances of "Love/Art Blues" and "Through My Sails". The following day he recorded several more songs with bassist Tim Drummond, "Pardon My Heart", "Homefires", "Hawaiian Sunrise" and "Love Is a Rose", as well as "L.A. Girls And Ocean Boys," a solo piano piece. Each of these performances were released in 2020 on Neil Young Archives Volume II: 1972–1976. A second recording of "Through My Sails" from June 17 (recorded with CSNY) would see release in 1975 on Zuma, along with "Pardon My Heart" (with new overdubs added).

"Love Is a Rose" is a reworking of Young's previous concert encore favorite "Dance, Dance, Dance" which had been recorded by Crazy Horse on their debut album. It features new lyrics and would later be covered by Linda Ronstadt.  Young would include "Love Is a Rose" on the 1977 compilation Decade.

During the 1974 CSNY tour, Young debuted 17 new songs on stage.  Two days before the group's performance at Wembley Stadium, Young recorded another new song, "White Line," with the Band's Robbie Robertson. It was recorded at Ramport Studios in London on September 12, 1974.  The Band had served as one of CSNY's opening acts during their summer tour. "White Line" was later recorded with Crazy Horse in 1975 for an unreleased album and again with the group in 1990 for Ragged Glory. It was also released in 2018 on Songs for Judy, a live album of solo performances recorded in 1976. A few months later, Young recorded further demos during a November 11 session at Broken Arrow Ranch with Tim Mulligan. Takes of "Vacancy," "One More Sign," "Frozen Man," "Give Me Strength," and "Bad News Comes to Town" all eventually appeared on Neil Young Archives Vol. II.

Studio sessions for Homegrown began in earnest in mid-December 1974 at Quadraphonic Sound Studios in Nashville (the earliest released recording, a version of "Love Art Blues" recorded on December 10, can be found on Volume II). On December 11, a band consisting of Nashville session musicians and Levon Helm recorded "The Old Homestead" and "Daughters", as well as the two songs that open Homegrown, "Separate Ways" and "Try". Young performed "Separate Ways" regularly with Booker T & the MGs in 1993 and with Crazy Horse in 2014. In "Try", Young pays tribute to Carrie Snodgress's mother by incorporating bits of her language into verse: 'I'd like to take a chance/but shit, Mary, I can't dance.' Emmylou Harris also contributed background vocals. Young would later perform "Try" regularly in 2007 and 2008.

Another band session at the same studio on December 13 yielded "Star of Bethlehem", "Homegrown" and "Deep Forbidden Lake".  "Homegrown", "a goofy tribute to hemp recorded in a much higher version by the Horse." "Homegrown" was re-recorded with Crazy Horse for the unreleased Chrome Dreams and released on American Stars 'n Bars in 1977.  "Star of Bethlehem" is an acoustic ballad featuring vocals by Emmylou Harris.  In a 1975 Cameron Crowe interview for Rolling Stone, Young indicated a desire to release parts of Homegrown on subsequent albums, citing, for example, the "beautiful harmonies" of Emmylou Harris. "Star of Bethlehem" would first see release on American Stars 'n Bars in 1977.  "Deep Forbidden Lake" was released on Decade in 1977.  In the liner notes to the compilation, Young mentions "Deep Forbidden Lake" as a track recorded for Homegrown. "Bad News Comes to Town," "Frozen Man" and several versions of "Changing Highways" (which was also recorded a week earlier with Crazy Horse at Chess Studios, a version which was released on Vol. II) were also recorded during these sessions at Quadrafonic.

Later that month, "We Don't Smoke It No More" and a third version of "Love/Art Blues" (which can also be found on Volume II) were recorded with his band at Broken Arrow on December 31, 1974. Four days later, a heavier version of "Vacancy" was recorded at the same studio with the same band. Versions of "Long May You Run," "Barefoot Floors" and "Motorcycle Mama" were also recorded during these sessions.

Final sessions took place at Village Recorder Studios in L.A. on January 21, 1975. This time the material consisted of short solo pieces featuring Young on guitar or piano. Among the songs recorded are "Little Wing", "Mexico", "Kansas" and the spoken word track "Florida".  "Little Wing" would see release in 1980 on Hawks & Doves.  Young would also play "Little Wing" live in 1977 and for only the 2nd time on Fireside Session II in 2020.  "Kansas" and "Mexico" are described in Shakey as "solo Young performances—short, fragmentary and hallucinogenic" "Kansas" was played on occasion in 1999, 2007 and 2008, and appears in the concert film Neil Young Trunk Show.  The lyrics of "Florida" were superimposed over the credits for On the Beach on the insert that accompanied the original vinyl release of Tonight's the Night.

Other songs from Homegrown sessions
"Through My Sails," recorded June 17 with Crosby, Stills and Nash, and "Pardon My Heart," recorded the day before, were both released on Young's Zuma in 1975. Other songs associated with the group, including "Human Highway," "Pushed It over the End" and "Hawaiian Sunrise" (aka "Maui Mama"), were also recorded during the period but possibly saved for the planned CSNY reunion album that would not materialize for another 14 years.
"Deep Forbidden Lake" was released on Decade in 1977. In the liner notes to the compilation, Young mentions "Deep Forbidden Lake" as a track recorded for Homegrown. It also appears on some of the trial lists for the album shown on his website.
"The Old Homestead" was released on Hawks & Doves in 1980.
"Love/Art Blues" was mentioned by Young in an August 1975 interview with Cameron Crowe for Rolling Stone in a discussion about the Homegrown sessions, along with "Pardon My Heart." "Love/Art Blues" would see release live on CSNY 1974, a 2014 document of the 1974 tour that also included Young's previously unreleased "Traces" and "Hawaiian Sunrise".
"Give Me Strength" would see release on 2017's Hitchhiker, a studio album that documents a solo performance by Young recorded in 1976. It was also released in 2018 on the live album Songs for Judy. "Hawaii" was also recorded at the same 1976 session and released in 2017 on Hitchhiker.
"Bad News Comes to Town" would see new life, this time with a horn section, during Young's 1988 tour with the Blue Notes, captured live on 2015's Bluenote Café.
"Homefires" was debuted live in the summer of 1974 and appears on tentative tracklistings for the album on the Neil Young Archives website. Young would also play the song on his 1992 solo tour, and then again on his 2018 solo tour.
"Mediterranean", "Frozen Man", and "Daughters" have also appeared on various Homegrown track lists, with takes of the latter two songs from the Homegrown sessions eventually appearing on the Neil Young Archives Volume II: 1972–1976.
The song "Barefoot Floors" was also written during this time and appears on several tentative track lists. A demo version (recorded in June 1974) was eventually released as an outtake on the Neil Young Archives website. It was also later covered by Nicolette Larson on her album Sleep, Baby, Sleep.

Near-release
Around 30 songs are reported to have been recorded between June 1974 and January 1975, many of which can be seen in hand written lists shown on Neil Young Archives, as several tracks lists were assembled before the album was canceled. The material from these sessions is largely acoustic, most of it being solo performances of Young on guitar and harmonica.  Young has said that "Homegrown is the missing link between Harvest, Comes a Time, Old Ways and Harvest Moon."  The songs are quite personal, and reveal much of his feelings on his failing relationship at the time with actress Carrie Snodgress.  "It was a little too personal... it scared me," Young would later explain to Cameron Crowe in interview.

It was so near to being released that a cover had been created. At the last moment however, Young chose to drop Homegrown and release instead Tonight's the Night, an unreleased album recorded in 1973. Young stated that he had a playback party for Homegrown and Tonight's the Night happened to be on the same reel. He decided to release Tonight's the Night after that listening because of "its overall strength in performance and feeling" and because Homegrown "was just a very down album."

Release
In 2010, Neil Young's on-line newspaper stated that Homegrown along with other period unreleased albums were being "rebuilt" for inclusion in the second volume of his Archives project.  Unlike similar unreleased collections from this period of Young's career, such as Chrome Dreams and the session acetates for Tonight's the Night, Homegrown never circulated in whole as a bootleg.

In July 2019, Neil Young Archives' mastering team began working on the original master tapes. The official site for Neil Young Archives shows several pictures of the tape boxes and respective handwritten notes, revealing much of the work that was required to create new analog masters using the original as a source. Safety copies were also used to substitute for the bits where the original tapes were damaged.

On November 21, 2019, an article was posted to Neil Young's Archives website announcing Homegrown as the first vinyl release scheduled for 2020. The article also included a short video of engineer John Hanlon overseeing an all-analog transfer of one of the album's songs ("We Don't Smoke It No More").

The album was released on June 19, 2020. "Try" was released as a single exclusively to the Neil Young's Archives website on May 13, 2020, followed by "Vacancy" on June 10, 2020.

The original release date of April 18, 2020 had to be delayed due to the COVID-19 pandemic.

Critical reception

Homegrown was met with universal acclaim from music critics. At Metacritic, which assigns a weighted average rating out of 100 to reviews from mainstream publications, this release received an average score of 88, based on 17 reviews.

Writing for The A.V. Club, Alex McLevy praised the release, writing that it is "no less masterful for having sat unheard all these years. If anything, the passing time has helped intensify the lush intimacy of the recordings, making Young’s spare and rich instrumentation (and old-school minimalist production) stand out all the more in an era of auto-tuned digitalization."

Track listing

Personnel
Tracks 1, 2, 5 and 12 produced by Neil Young and Elliot Mazer; tracks 3, 6, 7 and 11 produced by Neil Young and Ben Keith; tracks 4 and 9 produced by Neil Young and Tim Mulligan; tracks 8 and 10 produced by Neil Young, Ben Keith and Tim Mulligan. John Hanlon: assembly, pre-mastering, restoration.
 Neil Young: guitar (1, 2, 4, 5, 7–12), harmonica (1, 4, 7–12), piano (2, 3), wine glass (6), piano strings (6), narration (6), vocals (1–5, 7–12)
 Ben Keith: pedal steel guitar (1, 2), lap slide guitar (5, 8, 10), Dobro (12), wine glass (6), piano strings (6), narration (6), vocals (2, 8, 10, 12)
 Tim Drummond: bass (1, 2, 4, 5, 8, 10, 12), vocals (8, 10)
 Levon Helm: drums (1, 2)
 Karl T. Himmel: drums (5, 8, 10, 12)
 Robbie Robertson: guitar (9)
 Emmylou Harris: backing vocals (2, 12)
 Sandy Mazzeo: backing vocals (8)
 Stan Szelest: piano (8), Wurlitzer piano (10)

Cover art: Tom Wilkes.

Charts

Weekly charts

Year-end charts

References

Neil Young albums
2020 albums
Albums produced by David Briggs (producer)
Albums produced by Neil Young
Albums produced by Elliot Mazer